Amol Shinde (born 6 November 1985) is an Indian first-class cricketer who plays for Hyderabad.

References

External links
 

1985 births
Living people
Indian cricketers
Hyderabad cricketers
Cricketers from Hyderabad, India